George Brown Henderson (9 January 1902 – 18 March 1975) was a Scottish professional footballer who played as a defender for St Bernard's, Sunderland and Barnsley.

References

1902 births
1975 deaths
People from Kelty
Scottish footballers
Association football defenders
St Bernard's F.C. players
Sunderland A.F.C. players
Barnsley F.C. players
Cowdenbeath F.C. players
English Football League players
Footballers from Fife
Scottish Football League players